This is a list of winners of the Drama Desk Award for Outstanding Director introduced in 1955 to honour directors of plays and directors of musicals. From 1968, multiple awards were presented for each season. In 1975 the category was retired and divided into Drama Desk Award for Outstanding Director of a Play and Drama Desk Award for Outstanding Director of a Musical, with each discipline receiving its own.

Award winners

1950s

 1955: Jack Landau – The Clandestine Marriage / The White Devil
 No nominees
 1956: José Quintero – The Iceman Cometh
 No nominees

 1959: William Ball – Ivanov
 No nominees

1960s

 1965: Ulu Grosbard – A View from the Bridge
 No nominees
 1967: Joseph Hardy – You're a Good Man, Charlie Brown
 No nominees
 1968: Robert Moore – The Boys in the Band and Tom O'Horgan – Tom Paine
 No nominees

 1969: Tom O'Horgan – Futz
 Neal Kenyon – Dames at Sea
 Alan Arkin – Little Murders
 Michael Schultz – Does a Tiger Wear a Necktie?
 Gordon Davidson – In the Matter of J. Robert Oppenheimer
 Edwin Sherin – The Great White Hope
 No nominees

1970s

 1970: Jerzy Grotowski – The Apocalypse
 Alan Arkin – The White House Murder Case
 Ron Field – Applause
 Joseph Hardy – Child's Play
 Harold Prince – Company
 No nominees
 1971: Robert Wilson – Deafman Glance
 Andre Gregory – Alice in Wonderland
 Peter Brook – A Midsummer Night's Dream
 Michael Bennett – Follies
 Harold Prince – Follies
 Tom O'Horgan – Lenny
 Paul Sills – Ovid's Metamorphoses and Paul Sills' Story Theatre
 No nominees
 1972: Mel Shapiro – Older People
 Andrei Șerban – Medea
 Peter Hall – Old Times
 Jeff Bleckner – Sticks and Bones
 A. J. Antoon – That Championship Season
 Mel Shapiro – Two Gentlemen of Verona
 No nominees

 1973: Victor Garcia – Yerma
 Joseph Chaikin – The Mutation Show
 Roberta Sklar – The Mutation Show
 Harold Prince – A Little Night Music
 Bob Fosse – Pippin
 Michael Rudman – The Changing Room
 Harold Prince – The Great God Brown
 No nominees
 1974: José Quintero – A Moon for the Misbegotten
 Harold Prince – Candide
 Frank Dunlop – Scapino
 Marvin Felix Camillo – Short Eyes
 Harold Prince – The Visit
 No nominees

See also
 Drama Desk Award for Outstanding Director of a Play
 Drama Desk Award for Outstanding Director of a Musical

References

External links
 Drama Desk official website

Director